José Dariel Abreu Correa (born January 29, 1987) is a Cuban-born professional baseball first baseman for the Houston Astros of Major League Baseball (MLB). He has previously played in MLB for the Chicago White Sox. Overall he has had a fantastic career, as he has accumulated a 31.9 WAR, .292 AVG, .860 OPS and 134 OPS+ in his career.

Abreu played in the Cuban National Series for Cienfuegos before his defection from Cuba in August 2013. After being granted free agency by MLB, Abreu signed with the White Sox in October 2013. Since 2013, Abreu has performed primarily as a first baseman, however he has also filled in at designated hitter in slightly less than 20% of his current total of games played. Abreu won the AL Rookie of the Year Award in 2014, the Silver Slugger Award in 2014, 2018, and 2020, and the American League's Most Valuable Player Award in 2020.

Professional career

Cuban career
Abreu set a Cuban home run record in 2010–2011 and was named league MVP. He had played five seasons in the Cuban Serie Nacional through 2007–2008, hitting .295 and slugging .467. After 48 games in 2008–2009, he was batting .345/.368/.600, earning the infielder a spot on Cuba's provisional roster for the 2009 World Baseball Classic. He did not make the final cut and finished the season with a .346/.441/.630 batting line. He led the 2008-09 Cuban National Series with 30 times hit by pitch. He tied Yenier Bello and Alex Guerrero for 8th in homers (19), was eighth in slugging and fourth in strikeouts (69).

Abreu was 2-for-10 in the 2009 World Port Tournament, backing up Ariel Borrero at first base. In the 2009 Baseball World Cup, he hit .250/.333/.469 in his first major tournament. He was listed in the IBAF's Final Report as being one of the All-Star outfielders alongside teammate Alfredo Despaigne and Jon Weber, but other sources list Puerto Rico's Miguel Abreu, who had better statistics. He was not even used as a starter in the outfield, playing alongside Ariel Borrero at first. In the gold medal game, he did not appear as Borrero saw the action.

In 2009–2010, Abreu had his best year yet, hitting .400/.555/.822 with 82 runs, 30 homers, 76 RBI and 74 walks to 49 strikeouts in 89 games. He tied Leonys Martín for 6th in the Serie Nacional in runs, tied for third with 25 doubles, tied Yuli Gurriel for second in home runs (one behind Alfredo Despaigne in a to-the-wire home run race), was third with 235 total bases (behind Despaigne and Gourriel), again led with 30 times hit by pitch, tied Enrique Esteban Díaz for 4th in walks, led with 32 intentional walks (12 more than runner-up Yosvany Peraza), was second in average (.005 behind Despaigne), led in slugging (.008 over Despaigne) and probably led in OBP. He was named the All-Star first baseman.

Abreu was Cuba's starting first baseman when they won the 2010 Intercontinental Cup, their first Gold in an international tournament in three years. He hit .292/.320/.500. In the finale, he went 1-for-3 and scored the first run in the victory over the Dutch national baseball team; he doubled off Rob Cordemans in the third and came home on a Yorbis Borroto hit. He helped Cuba finish second at the 2010 Pan American Games Qualifying Tournament. In the 2010 World University Baseball Championship, he posted the best average by going 10-for-18 with two walks, a double, triple, four homers, nine runs and 12 RBI in six games as Cuba won the Gold. He was 0-for-4 in the finale, as Cuba edged Team USA. He was named the event's All-Star 1B.

Abreu continued to improve in 2010–11 Cuban National Series with one of the greatest seasons in Cuban history. He hit .453/.597/.986 with 79 runs, 93 RBI and 33 home runs in only 66 games. Despite missing 23 games due to bursitis in his shoulder, he broke Despaigne's home run record (as did Yoenis Céspedes — both hit their 33rd on the season's last day). Despaigne would reclaim the record a year later. Abreu led the league in average (.052 over Michel Enríquez), slugging (a whopping .212 over runner-up Frederich Cepeda), intentional walks (21) and homers (tied with Yoenis Céspedes), was second in RBI (6 behind Céspedes), tied for eighth in runs with Donal Duarte, was seventh in total bases (209) and 4th in times hit by pitch (21). Had he not been injured, he would have likely easily won a Triple Crown. He won Cuban National Series Most Valuable Player Award. He was the second MVP from Cienfuegos, following Pedro José Rodríguez, Sr. by 31 years.

Abreu was part of the Cuba national baseball team at the 2013 World Baseball Classic. In Cuba's six games, he batted .383 and hit three home runs while recording nine RBIs.

Chicago White Sox
In August 2013, Abreu defected from Cuba to test the MLB free agent market. His defection was later confirmed by former teammate Henry Urrutia. He established residency in Haiti. He then made his way to the Dominican Republic, where Henry Urrutia's agents planned to showcase him.  In October, he signed a six-year contract with the Chicago White Sox worth $68 million. On the White Sox, Abreu joined fellow Cuban players Alexei Ramírez, Dayán Viciedo, and Rule 5 draft pick Adrian Nieto.

2014: AL Rookie of the Year

Abreu recorded his first major league hit on March 31, 2014, against the Minnesota Twins. On April 8, 2014, Abreu hit the first two home runs of his career in a game at Coors Field, helping his team defeat the Colorado Rockies 15-3. On April 25, 2014, he captured his eighth home run of the year off Chris Archer, tying the rookie record for homers in March/April. Later that night, Abreu recorded his third multi-homer game with a walk-off grand slam off Tampa Bay Rays pitcher Grant Balfour giving him nine homers in his first month in the Major Leagues, surpassing the record of eight shared by Albert Pujols (2001), Carlos Delgado (1994), and Kent Hrbek (1982). Two days later, Abreu broke the rookie record for RBI in the month of April with 31, and extended the April rookie home run record to 10. For his performance, Abreu was awarded a share of the AL Player of the Week Award for April 21-27 along with Seattle Mariners' third baseman Kyle Seager. During this week, Abreu batted .310 with 5 home runs, 14 RBI and an .862 slugging percentage .

On May 18, Abreu was placed on the 15-day disabled list with tendinitis in his left ankle. On June 2, Abreu returned from the DL to face the Los Angeles Dodgers. In his second at bat after his return, Abreu hit a two-run home run off Dodgers ace Clayton Kershaw.

On July 6, Abreu was selected to the 2014 MLB All-Star Game along with teammates Alexei Ramírez and Chris Sale. At the All-Star Break, Abreu had a .292 batting average with 73 RBIs and an MLB-leading 29 home runs. During the season, Abreu was named both player of the month and rookie of the month for April & July, being something where no one else in baseball had ever won both awards in the same month twice in one season. Having won the rookie honor in June, Abreu became only the fourth player to win the Rookie of the Month honor three or more times in a season.

Abreu finished the season with a White Sox rookie record 36 home runs. He won the 2014 Sporting News American League Rookie of the Year Award. He was awarded the AL Silver Slugger Award for first basemen, becoming the only White Sox first baseman besides Frank Thomas to ever gain the honor. Abreu was unanimously named the 2014 AL Rookie of the Year by the BBWAA on November 10, 2014.

2015
Abreu had an effective sophomore season in 2015, batting .290/.347/.502 with 30 home runs and 101 RBIs in 154 games. His .502 slugging percentage and 67 extra-base hits both ranked tenth in the American League.

2016
Abreu continued his productive pace in 2016 as he batted .293/.353/.468 with 25 home runs and 100 RBIs for the White Sox.

2017
On September 9, 2017, Abreu hit for the cycle against the San Francisco Giants, becoming the first White Sox player to hit for the cycle since José Valentín on April 27, 2000. In 2017, Abreu held many of the top 20 ranks within MLB, 8th in MLB for batting average, batting .304 for the season, and led the league in total bases. Abreu created a total of 116 runs throughout the season, placing him at fifth in the American League. He was third in the league for triples, hitting 6 over the course of the regular season, and had 82 total extra base hits, making him second in the league.

2018
In 2018, Abreu again was selected to play in the 2018 All-Star Game as part of the American League team as a first baseman. After the 2018 season, he was also awarded his second Silver Slugger Award for first basemen. He batted .265/.325/.473 in 2018, each the lowest figure of his Major League Baseball career.

2019
In 2019, Abreu batted .284/.330/.503 with 33 home runs and led the American League in RBIs (123) and sacrifice flies (10), and led the major leagues in grounding into double plays (24). On defense, he had a -4 Defensive Runs Saved (DRS) rating, the lowest in the American League among first basemen.

On November 14, 2019, Abreu agreed to the White Sox's qualifying offer of a one-year, $17.8 million contract. On November 22, Abreu signed a three-year contract with the White Sox worth $50 million, superseding his previously accepted qualifying offer.

2020: AL MVP
Abreu had another strong offensive season for the White Sox in 2020. On August 22 and 23 against the Chicago Cubs, Abreu tied an MLB record by hitting a home run in four straight at-bats. Abreu hit 3 home runs in his 3 at-bats on August 22 off Kyle Hendricks, Rowan Wick, and Duane Underwood Jr. Then the next day, Abreu hit a home run in his first at-bat off Yu Darvish. Overall, Abreu batted .317/.370/.617, equalling a career high in batting average while setting a new career best for slugging. Abreu led the American League in slugging percentage, RBIs (60), games played (60), hits (76), extra base hits (34), total bases (148), double plays grounded into (10; leading the league for the second consecutive year), and errors by a first baseman (5), while also finishing in the top 10 in home runs (19, 2nd) and doubles (15, 9th). Abreu's strong season helped to lead the White Sox to their first postseason berth since 2008. In game 1 of the Wild Card Series against the Oakland Athletics, Abreu hit his first postseason home run in his second at-bat off Jesus Luzardo. The Sox would win the game 4–1 but would lose the next 2 games which eliminated them. For his efforts during the regular season, Abreu was named the AL MVP, becoming the first White Sox player to win the award since Frank Thomas in 1994. Abreu became the fourth different White Sox player to win AL MVP joining Thomas, Dick Allen, and Nellie Fox.

2021
In 2021, Abreu tested positive for COVID-19 after arriving at spring training. His first practice with the White Sox was on February 27, five days after their first full-squad workout. 

On April 14, 2021, in a game against the Cleveland Indians in top of the 9th inning, Abreu made a play at first base and was credited with saving a no-hitter for Carlos Rodon. Abreu picked up a ground ball that hit off of Josh Naylor and with Naylor sprinting as fast as he could to first base, Abreu stretched his right foot out like he was a baserunner sliding to the bag and his foot touched the base just before Naylor reached it with his headfirst slide attempt. On May 14, 2021, Abreu was involved in a collision at the first base line with Kansas City Royals batter Hunter Dozier during the first game of a double header. Neither of them played in the second game of the double header, but Abreu returned to play on the following day. On May 16, Abreu scored a walk-off run on a wild pitch by Kansas City Royals pitcher Wade Davis. On August 12, 2021, in a game played at the MLB at Field of Dreams site in Dyersville, Iowa, Abreu hit the first ever official Major League home run to be connected in Iowa off Andrew Heaney. Overall in 2021, Abreu took a step back. Despite hitting 30 home runs and 117 RBIs during the season, he had an OPS+ of 124 in 152 games while last season it was a 165 OPS+. He was also hit 22 times by pitches. He grounded into 28 double plays, more than any other major leaguer.

2022
The 2022 season was much better than the 2021 season as Abreu batted .304/.378/.446 with a 133 OPS+ and 4.2 WAR in 157 games. However, he had a significant decrease in power, hitting only 15 home runs, which could be due to a very pitcher dominated year.

Houston Astros
On November 28, 2022, Abreu signed a three-year, $58.5 million contract with the Houston Astros.

Personal life
Abreu wears #79, an unusually high uniform number. His mother, Daysi Correa, chose the number so that people would remember it. Abreu's mother and the rest of his extended family remained in Cuba until his parents moved to the United States in May 2014. The 2014 MLB All-Star Game was the first game in which his parents saw him play since leaving Cuba.

See also

 Cuban National Series Most Valuable Player Award
 List of baseball players who defected from Cuba
 List of Chicago White Sox award winners and league leaders
 List of current Major League Baseball players by nationality
 List of Major League Baseball annual putouts leaders
 List of Major League Baseball career slugging percentage leaders
 List of Major League Baseball players from Cuba
 List of Major League Baseball players to hit for the cycle

References

External links

IBAF

1987 births
Living people
American League Most Valuable Player Award winners
Chicago White Sox players
Defecting Cuban baseball players
2013 World Baseball Classic players
People from Cruces, Cuba
Major League Baseball players from Cuba
Cuban expatriate baseball players in the United States
Elefantes de Cienfuegos players
Major League Baseball first basemen
Silver Slugger Award winners
American League All-Stars
American League RBI champions
Major League Baseball Rookie of the Year Award winners
Pan American Games medalists in baseball
Pan American Games bronze medalists for Cuba
Baseball players at the 2011 Pan American Games
Medalists at the 2011 Pan American Games